Steven Mark Grossman (January 18, 1951August 13, 2020) was an American jazz fusion and hard bop saxophonist.

Grossman was Wayne Shorter's replacement in Miles Davis's jazz-fusion band. He played with Chick Corea on the album "The Sun" in 1970, then, from 1971 to 1973, he was in Elvin Jones's band.

In the late 1970s, he was part of the Stone Alliance trio with Don Alias and Gene Perla. The group released four albums during this period, including one featuring Brazilian trumpeter Márcio Montarroyos. The albums also feature an array of other musicians. They went on to release three live reunion albums during the 2000s.

Personal life
Grossman was born in Brooklyn, New York, United States, on January 18, 1951, to Rosalind, an amateur pianist, and Irving, an RCA salesman and later president of KLH Research and Development Corporation. He died of cardiac arrest in Glen Cove, New York, on August 13, 2020, at the age of 69.

Discography

As leader
1974: Some Shapes to Come (PM Records, with Don Alias, Jan Hammer, Gene Perla)
1975: Jazz A Confronto 23 (Horo Records), with Alessio Urso, Afonso Vieira, Irio De Paula and Nilton Castro
1977: Terra Firma (PM Records)
1977: Born at the Same Time with Patrice Caratini, Michel Graillier, Daniel Humair
1978: New Moon (Musica)
1979: Perspective (Atlantic Records), with Mark Egan, Marcus Miller, Lenny White, Onaje Allan Gumbs
1984: Way Out East Vol 1 & 2 with Juini Booth, Joe Chambers
1984: Hold the Line with Juini Booth, Hugh Lawson, Masahiro Yoshida
1985: Love Is The Thing with Billy Higgins, Cedar Walton, David Williams
1985: Steve Grossman Quartet Vol 1 & 2
1985: Standards with Walter Booker, Fred Henke, Masahiro Yoshida
1986: Katonah
1989: Bouncing with Mr. A.T., with Tyler Mitchell, Art Taylor
1990: Moon Train
1990: Reflections
1990: Live: Cafe Praga
1990: My Second Prime
1991: Do It with Barry Harris, Reggie Johnson, Art Taylor
1991: In New York with Avery Sharpe, Art Taylor, McCoy Tyner
1993: Time to Smile with Tom Harrell, Elvin Jones, Cecil McBee, Willie Pickens
1992: I'm Confessin with Jimmy Cobb, Fred Henke, Reggie Johnson, Harold Land
1993: Small Hotel with Billy Higgins, Cedar Walton, David Williams
1998: Steve Grossman Quartet with Michel Petrucciani with Joe Farnsworth, Andy McKee, Michel Petrucciani
2000: Johnny Griffin & Steve Grossman Quintet with Johnny Griffin, Michael Weiss, Pierre Michelot, Alvin Queen
2006: The Bible with Don Alias, Jan Hammer, Gene Perla

As sidemanWith Miles DavisMiles Davis at Fillmore: Live at the Fillmore East (1970)
A Tribute to Jack Johnson (1970)
Live-Evil (1970)
Black Beauty: Live at the Fillmore West (1973, recorded 1970)
Big Fun (1974, recorded 1969–1972)
Get Up with It (1974, recorded 1970–1974)
Miles at the Fillmore – Miles Davis 1970: The Bootleg Series Vol. 3 (2014, recorded 1970)With Elvin Jones'''Merry-Go-Round (Blue Note, 1971)Mr. Jones (Blue Note, 1972) Live at the Lighthouse (Blue Note, 1972)  At This Point in Time (Blue Note, 1973)New Agenda (Vanguard, 1975)The Main Force'' (Vanguard, 1976)

References

External links
[ Allmusic]
Stone Alliance Discogs

American jazz saxophonists
American male saxophonists
Musicians from New York City
1951 births
2020 deaths
Red Records artists
DIW Records artists
Timeless Records artists
Jazz musicians from New York (state)
21st-century American saxophonists
21st-century American male musicians
American male jazz musicians
Jewish American musicians
21st-century American Jews
20th-century American saxophonists